In Greek mythology, Alcyone is a minor figure who was transformed into the bird bearing her name after she was murdered by her own father Sciron. Her tale is a variation on the more known myth of the kingfisher, starring Alcyone and Ceyx.

Etymology 
The proper name  is derived from the ancient Greek word for kingfisher. Its ultimate origin is unknown, though it is probably a loan from a non-Indo-European language. A false folk etymology connecting it with the word  (háls, meaning "salt") gave rise to the alternative spelling  (halkuṓn).

Mythology 
According to Pseudo-Probus's commentary on Virgil, Alcyone was the daughter of an Attic man named Sciron, the son of Polypemon. Her father, who wished to see his daughter wed at last, ordered her to look for a husband, and Alcyone proceeded to sleep with many men. When he found out about his daughter's promiscuity, Sciron was enraged, and cast Alcyone into the sea, whereupon she was transformed into a kingfisher, a bird beloved by Thetis.

Pseudo-Probus says that this version is Theodorus's, from a lost Metamorphoses work of his; he adds that Ovid in his own Metamorphoses is going by Nicander's version (which has also been lost). In the Metamorphoses, Ovid writes that Alcyone and Ceyx were a beloved couple. Ceyx died at sea, and when Alcyone learnt of his demise, she threw herself off a cliff. Hera, pitying the couple, transformed them both into kingfishers, a story also supported by Virgil, Apollodorus and Hyginus. Pseudo-Probus, Ovid and Hyginus all make the metamorphosis the origin of the etymology for "halcyon days", the seven days in winter when storms never occur so the birds can lay their eggs.

Despite Ovid going by a different version than the one pseudo-Probus had in mind, he evidently knew (and referenced) both of them, albeit the second in a very subtle and obscure way in the lines:

It is possible that the original myth was a simpler version closer to Nicander's one, where a woman named Alcyone wept for her unnamed husband; Ceyx was probably added later due to him being an important figure in poetry, and having a wife named Alcyone (as evidenced from the Hesiodic poem Wedding of Ceyx).

See also 

 Titus Andronicus
 Aerope
 Io
 Nyctaea

References

Bibliography 
 
 
 
 
 Hyginus, Gaius Julius, The Myths of Hyginus. Edited and translated by Mary A. Grant, Lawrence: University of Kansas Press, 1960.
  Online version at Perseus.tufts project.
 
 
 
 
 Valerius Probus, In Vergillii Bucolica et Georgica Commentarius, 1848. Online version on Google books.

External links 
 

Metamorphoses characters
Metamorphoses into birds in Greek mythology
Attican characters in Greek mythology
Women in Greek mythology